Nat Borchers (born April 13, 1981) is an American former soccer player who played as a defender. He won the MLS Cup in 2009 with Real Salt Lake and in 2015 with the Portland Timbers.

Youth and college career
Born in Tucson, Arizona, Borchers attended East High School in Pueblo, Colorado where he played on the boys' soccer team. In his four years at East High School, he was selected all-league three times and All-State once. He was chosen as the League MVP his senior year. He also played for the youth club, Colorado Storm (Club Colorado Select). In addition to playing soccer, Borchers ran track and played basketball.

Borchers played four years of college soccer for the University of Denver from 1999 to 2002, and also excelled for the Colorado Rapids' PDL affiliate, the Boulder Rapids Reserve. He was selected all-league three times and was the MVP of the league in his senior year at DU. Despite this, Borchers went undrafted in the 2003 MLS SuperDraft. Borchers earned his bachelor's and master's degrees in accounting while in school.

Club career

Borchers was signed to the Colorado Rapids developmental roster on March 18, 2003. However, he soon proved to be far better than most had expected and by the middle of the 2003 season had secured a starting spot in Colorado's first team central defense. Throughout the 2005 season, Borchers continued to anchor the Rapids defense.

In 2006, Borchers was transferred to Norwegian club Odd Grenland. In February 2008, Borchers signed with MLS side Real Salt Lake on a transfer, after being released by Odd Grenland. His success with RSL in his first three seasons with the club led to a long-term deal announced on February 14, 2011, that kept Borchers in Salt Lake through the 2014 season.

On December 8, 2014, Borchers was traded to Portland Timbers in exchange for allocation funds. During his time with the Timbers, Borchers had been a starting defender contributing in the club's 2015 Championship run. The defender in 2016 had suffered with a leg injury that had him out for the rest of the season. On February 2, 2017, he retired from professional soccer.

International career
Borchers' surprising 2003 season led to him being called up for the Under-23 team's Olympic Qualifiers, in which the team was eliminated. He earned his first cap for the senior national team on March 9, 2005, against Colombia. Nat most recently played for the senior team on November 17, 2010, against South Africa, entering in the 67th minute.

Outside football
In addition to soccer, Borchers is an active real estate investor and agent.

Career statistics

Club

International

Honors
Real Salt Lake
MLS Cup: 2009
Eastern Conference (playoffs): 2009
Western Conference (playoffs): 2013

Portland Timbers
MLS Cup: 2015
Western Conference (playoffs): 2015

References

External links
 
 Odd Grenland profile (Norwegian)
 

1981 births
Living people
American soccer players
American expatriate soccer players
Soccer players from Tucson, Arizona
Denver Pioneers men's soccer players
Colorado Rapids U-23 players
Colorado Rapids players
Odds BK players
Real Salt Lake players
Portland Timbers players
Expatriate footballers in Norway
Eliteserien players
Soccer players from Colorado
USL League Two players
Major League Soccer players
United States men's under-23 international soccer players
United States men's international soccer players
Association football defenders